Botlhapatlou or Bothapatlou is a village in Kweneng District of Botswana. The village is located 55 km north of Molepolole. The population of Botlhapatlou was 915 in the 2001 census.

References

Kweneng District
Villages in Botswana